The  was a Japanese coin worth one two-hundredth of a Japanese yen, as 100 sen equalled 1 yen. All half sen coins were minted during the Meiji period between 1873 and 1888, and are made from nearly pure copper. These coins were later replaced for a brief time by another coin with the same value in the 1910s. The half sen coin was demonetized at the end of 1953 along with other subsidiary coinage and is no longer legal tender. They are now readily available for collectors to own as half sen coins were minted in large quantities.

History
Half sen coins along with twelve other denominations were adopted by the Meiji government in an act signed on June 27, 1871. This new coinage gave Japan a western style decimal system which was based on units of yen, sen, and rin. Each half sen coin was authorized to weigh 55 grains (3.56 g) struck in a copper alloy. The first coins minted are dated 1870 (year 3), but these were intended as trial strikes or pattern coins. Circulating coins were officially minted starting in 1873 (year 6) with a newly adopted design which eliminated a sunburst previously used on the reverse. All of these coins have the value written in both Arabic and Kanji on opposing sides. The obverse features a dragon with the date of reign, while the reverse has a wreath with a Chrysanthemum seal located above. The half sen was legal tender only up to the amount of 1 yen which was fixed by government regulations. Production of half sen coins continued with the exception of 1878 (year 11) for every year until 1888 (year 21). It is possible that non circulating half sen coins were made again in 1892 (year 25) for display at the World's Columbian Exposition. Coins with a value of one-two-hundredth of a yen were not mentioned again until the Japanese government went on the gold standard in 1897. The half sen coin was later replaced for a brief time by another coin with the same value in the late 1910s. Half sen coins were eventually demonetized at the end of 1953 when the Japanese government passed a law abolishing subsidiary coinage in favor of the yen.

Half sen coins are now bought and sold as collectibles with some more rare than others. The value of any given coin is determined by survivability rate and condition as collectors in general prefer uncleaned appealing coins. Two different varieties exist for the half sen coin in regard to the dragon featured on the reverse side of the coin. One variety has "V scales", while the other design shows "square scales" with the latter being more scarce. Overall, coins from this series can easily be obtained as they were issued in large amounts. An exception includes coins dated 1877 (year 10) with square scales, as this rare variety is worth a premium amount.

Circulation figures

Meiji

The following are circulation figures for the half sen coin, all of which were minted between the 3rd, and 21st year of Meiji's reign. The dates all begin with the Japanese symbol 明治 (Meiji), followed by the year of his reign the coin was minted. Each coin is read clockwise from right to left, so in the example used below "二十" would read as "year 12" or 1879.

"Year" ← "Number representing year of reign" ← "Emperors name" (Ex: 年 ← 二十 ← 治明)

See also

Half penny (disambiguation), similar denominations in other currencies

Notes

References

Coins of Japan
Japanese sen
Half-cent coins